Jonas Donald Gaines (January 9, 1914 – August 6, 1998), nicknamed "Lefty", was an American baseball pitcher in the Negro leagues. He played professionally from 1937 to 1953 with several teams. 

A native of New Roads, Louisiana, Gaines served in the US Army during World War II. He pitched in three East-West All-Star Games; 1942, 1946, and 1950. Gaines also pitched in the Cuban League and the Pacific League. He died in Baker, Louisiana in 1998 at age 84.

References

External links

 and Baseball-Reference Black Baseball stats and Seamheads

1914 births
1998 deaths
Baltimore Elite Giants players
Newark Eagles players
Philadelphia Stars players
Washington Elite Giants players
Hankyu Braves players
Baseball players from Louisiana
American expatriate baseball players in Japan
People from New Roads, Louisiana
Azules de Veracruz players
American expatriate baseball players in Mexico
Bismarck Barons players
Carlsbad Potashers players
Diablos Rojos del México players
Minot Mallards players
Pampa Oilers players
United States Army personnel of World War II
African Americans in World War II
Baseball pitchers
African-American United States Army personnel

ja:ルーファス・ゲインズ